Azimuth '85 is the fourth and next-to-last album by British jazz trio Azimuth featuring trumpeter Kenny Wheeler, vocalist Norma Winstone, and pianist John Taylor recorded in 1985 and released on the ECM label.

Reception

The AllMusic review by Michael G. Nastos awarded the album 3 stars calling stating "It's an acquired taste, but if you do, you'll not let go".

The authors of the Penguin Guide to Jazz Recordings expressed disappointment in the album, calling it "an unconfident step back," and stating that the band "fell into the trap... of letting a style become a manner."

Tyran Grillo, writing for Between Sound and Space, called the album "Azimuth's zenith and another significant chapter of ECM’s backstory," and commented: "Essential for many reasons, not least of all for Taylor, who plays as if he were holding an inanimate body in his hands, tracing its every contour until it comes back to life."

Track listing
All compositions by John Taylor and lyrics by Norma Winstone except as indicated

 "Adios Iony" - 7:00
 "Dream/Lost Song" - 5:55
 "Who Are You?" (Kenny Wheeler, Jane White) - 3:42
 "Breathtaking" - 6:25
 "Potion 1" - 2:17
 "February Daze" - 6:20
 "Til Bakeblikk" - 9:04
 "Potion 2" - 3:36

Personnel
Azimuth
John Taylor — piano, organ
Kenny Wheeler — trumpet, flugelhorn
Norma Winstone — vocals

References

ECM Records albums
Azimuth (band) albums
1985 albums
Albums produced by Manfred Eicher